Maurice Georges Eugène Le Boucher (25 May 1882 – 9 September 1964), was a French organist, composer, and pedagogue.

Le Boucher was born in Isigny-sur-Mer. In 1904, he entered the Conservatoire de Paris, where he was a student of Gabriel Fauré. In 1907, Le Boucher won the prestigious Grand Prix de Rome. Later, he became professor at the École Niedermeyer and organist at St. Germain-l'Auxerrois in Paris. He wrote an Organ Symphony in E major, which was published in 1917 by Éditions Leduc, Paris. He wrote a drama on Oscar Wilde la Duchesse de Padoue which was published by Salabert in 1931. In 1920, he was appointed as director of the Montpellier Conservatory, a post he held for 22 years. His students included André David.

Le Boucher died in 1964 in Paris.

External links 
 Musimen

1882 births
1964 deaths
People from Isigny-sur-Mer
20th-century classical composers
French classical organists
French male organists
French classical composers
French male classical composers
20th-century organists
20th-century French composers
20th-century French male musicians
Conservatoire de Paris alumni
Prix de Rome for composition
Male classical organists